Tropical Storm Charley was the third named storm of the 1998 Atlantic hurricane season. Charley was the first of two tropical storms to make landfall in Texas during that season (Frances being the other). The storm originated with a tropical wave that moved off the West African coast on August 9. The wave moved generally west-northwestward, producing occasional bursts of convection, finally arriving in the southeastern Gulf of Mexico by August 19, when animated satellite images began to indicate it had possibly developed a low pressure center. Hurricane Hunter investigations into the system the next day revealed that this was not the case. The depression became a tropical storm later that day, as it moved steadily west-northwestward, strengthening, and then weakening again before making landfall the next morning around Port Aransas, Texas. The storm moved slowly inland and finally dissipated on the morning of the August 24 near the town of Del Rio, Texas.

Charley's impacts in Texas and Mexico were locally severe. In Texas, over 2000 homes were destroyed by the locally severe flooding, and 13 people died.

Meteorological history
Charley originated with a large swirl of clouds which parted off of the west coast of Africa on August 9. Lacking deep convection or a well defined center, the wave continued west-northwestward without developing. Ten days later, on August 19, satellite images indicated the disturbance was beginning to rotate cyclonically over the southeastern Gulf of Mexico. A reconnaissance aircraft flew into the system the next day. While strong winds were recorded, no circulation center was present. The following morning, a second flight reported that a center had formed, and the disturbance was designated a tropical depression. Initially, the center was disorganized. However, convection over the depression blossomed, mostly concentrated over the northern semicircle. During the evening of August 21, the system was named Tropical Storm Charley.

As the system continued west-northwestward, more organized banding features developed, and the storm began to intensify. Within hours, Charley was downgraded to tropical depression status as it continued to weaken. By August 24, Charley had dissipated over the Rio Grande near Del Rio, Texas. Although surface winds had diminished and a closed surface circulation no longer existed, a slow-moving remnant circulation aloft persisted in the Del Rio area and generated flooding rains that were most devastating in that area on August 23 and the 24.

Preparations

Tropical storm warnings were issued by the National Hurricane Center coincidentally with the first advisory on the depression, from High Island, Texas to Brownsville. Six hours later, these were extended eastward to Cameron, Louisiana. At landfall on August 22, the warnings north of Sabine Pass, Texas were expired, and the rest were dropped later that day.

In advance of the storm, thousands of oil workers were evacuated from Gulf of Mexico oil rigs. In Del Rio, some highways and roads were closed after the initial flooding, in anticipation of more flooding as the system stalled over the area. Of the 2000 Laredo, Texas residents ordered to leave their homes in anticipation of the Rio Grande overflowing its banks, only 600 actually did so.

Impact

Being relatively weak, the storm's main impact was its heavy rainfall. Prolific, sometimes record amounts fell over much of south central Texas and northern Mexico. Few areas received sustained tropical storm force winds, and the storm surge was insignificant. There were no confirmed tornadoes.
Twenty people died, all from drowning, and the storm caused $50 million (1998 USD; US$64 million in 2007) in damage.

Texas
The storm's major impact was its very heavy rain. Charley produced  of rain in Del Rio in a 24-hour period, a new record daily rainfall for the city. Refugio, Texas received  of rain, and Woodsboro, Texas recorded . The storm surge on areas of the Texas coast was small. No tornadoes were confirmed by any NWS offices, although one suspected tornado did prompt a tornado warning.

Damage from the storm, while generally light, was severe locally. In Val Verde County, Texas, which took the vast majority of the damage, roughly 2000 houses, mobile homes, and apartments combined were destroyed by flooding. At one point, two-thirds of Del Rio was underwater after a natural dam broke in the San Felipe Creek, flooding the city with a sudden surge of water. The coastal storm surge destroyed several of the dunes on San Jose and Mustang Islands. There was also slight damage on Matagorda Island, where two shelters were destroyed by the surge flooding. Four people, including two toddlers, died when their truck was swept away by floodwaters and nine more drowned in flooding along the San Felipe Creek. Thirteen people died in Texas, all drownings. Charley left $50 million (1998 USD; US$64 million in 2007) in flood damage across southern Texas. Eight counties in Texas were declared disaster areas.

Mexico
While Mexico was not severely impacted by winds from the storm, heavy rain caused serious flooding in places. Jimenez received  of rainfall. In Ciudad Acuña, Coahuila,  of flooding occurred as a result of the heavy rains. 450 houses were damaged in the city, and over 2000 people were injured. In Nuevo Laredo, Tamaulipas, heavy rains swelled the Rio Grande and caused significant flooding. 350 families were evacuated, and the city lost power and phone service.

Seven people died in Ciudad Acuña while they were trying to cross a flooded gully.

Louisiana
Several inches of rain fell in parts of Louisiana. Isolated wind gusts reached tropical storm force, and Lake Charles recorded a  gust. Charley did not cause any significant damage in Louisiana.

See also

Other storms of the same name
Tropical Storm Erin (2007)

References

Charley
Charley (1998)
Charley (1998)
Charley (1998)
Charley (1998)
1998 natural disasters in the United States
1998 in Mexico
1998 in Louisiana
1998 in Texas